Deborah Hautzig (born 1956, New York) is an American author of several children's books, including the Little Witch series.

Biography 
She is the daughter of Walter Hautzig and Esther Hautzig, who wrote the book The Endless Steppe. She graduated from the Chapin School in New York. She published her first novel while still a student at Sarah Lawrence College.

In addition to the Little Witch series, Deborah has written over 35 Sesame Street books. She has written versions of children's classics such as The Secret Garden, The Little Mermaid, and The Nutcracker.

She has also written two young adult books, Hey Dollface! and Second Star to the Right, which was loosely based on her own battle with anorexia, a battle she did not win until after finishing writing it.

References 

American children's writers
Jewish American writers
American people of Austrian-Jewish descent
American people of Polish-Jewish descent
American people of Lithuanian-Jewish descent
Writers from New York (state)
1956 births
Living people
Chapin School (Manhattan) alumni
21st-century American Jews